The 1st China–Japan–Korea Friendship Athletic Meeting was held at the Jinhua Sport Center in Jinhua, China on July 6, 2014.

Medal summary

Men

Women

Score table

Overall

Men

Women

Results

Men

100 meters
Prior to the competition, the records were as follows:

Final – 19:50 –

Wind: +1.0 m/s

400 meters
Prior to the competition, the records were as follows:

Final – 19:10 –

110 meters hurdles
Prior to the competition, the records were as follows:

Final – 20:10 –

Wind: +2.5 m/s

4 x 100 meters relay
Prior to the competition, the records were as follows:

Final – 20:40 –

Pole vault
Prior to the competition, the records were as follows:

Final – 19:25 –

Long jump
Prior to the competition, the records were as follows:

Final – 20:15 –

Javelin throw
Prior to the competition, the records were as follows:

Final – 19:05 –

Women

200 meters
Prior to the competition, the records were as follows:

Final – 19:30 –

Wind: +1.2 m/s

800 meters
Prior to the competition, the records were as follows:

Final – 20:30 –

400 meters hurdles
Prior to the competition, the records were as follows:

Final – 19:00 –

4 x 400 meters relay
Prior to the competition, the records were as follows:

Final – 20:50 –

High jump
Prior to the competition, the records were as follows:

Final – 19:45 –

Triple jump
Prior to the competition, the records were as follows:

Final – 19:15 –

Javelin throw
Prior to the competition, the records were as follows:

Final – 20:05 –

References 

Reports
Mulkeen, Jon and organisers (2014-07-06). Xie and Gao lead China to victory at Friendship Meeting in Jinhua. IAAF. Retrieved on 2016-07-06.
(2014-07-09). Friendship Athletic Meeting Concluded with Crown Success. CAA. Retrieved on 2016-07-06.
Results
Full results. CAA. Retrieved on 2016-07-06.

External links
Chinese Athletic Association

China-Japan-Korea Friendship Athletic Meeting
International athletics competitions hosted by China
China–Japan–Korea Friendship Athletic Meeting